Annette Doreen Campbell (born ) is a British weightlifter, competing in the 63 kg category and representing England and Great Britain at international competitions. She competed at world championships, most recently at the 2003 World Weightlifting Championships.

Major results

* By 2002, medals were awarded in all three categories.

References

1961 births
Living people
British female weightlifters
People from Camberwell
Weightlifters at the 2006 Commonwealth Games
English female weightlifters
Black British sportswomen
Commonwealth Games competitors for England